is a dam in Shibata, Niigata Prefecture, Japan, completed in 1973. It is located about 5 kilometers downstream from the Kajigawa Dam.

References 

Dams in Niigata Prefecture
Dams completed in 1973